This is a list of Spanish television related events in 1976.

Events 
 19 March: Second season of Un, dos, tres... responda otra vez, debuts on La 1, with a cast including among others Victoria Abril and María Casal.
 22 May: Last episode of anime Heidi airs on TVE; it is the first Japanese anime broadcast in Spain.
 22 June: Clown Fofó's death shocks Spain.
 23 July: Rafael Anson is appointed Director General of RTVE.
 30 October: María Ostiz, representing Spain wins the Festival de la OTI with the song Canta cigarra.

Debuts

Television shows

La 1

Ending this year

La 1

Foreign series debuts in Spain

Births

Deaths
 10 April - Venancio Muro, actor, 47.
 22 June - Fofó, clown, 53.
 17 August - Valentín Tornos, actor, 75.

See also
 1976 in Spain
 List of Spanish films of 1976

References 

1976 in Spanish television